is a Japanese male volleyball player and Olympian from Hirakata city, Osaka. He plays for Panasonic Panthers and the Japanese national team (Ryujin Nippon).

Personal life 
Otsuka has a younger sister.

Career 
Otsuka started to play volleyball at the 3rd year of elementary school by entering in Panasonic Panthers Junior club. Then, in the six grade, he attended at "JVA Men's and Women's Elite Academy Training Camp" held by Japan Volleyball Association, in order to find the future players for the  national team. In 2017, he was called for Japan men's national under-19 volleyball team for the first time and then was called for U-21 and U-23, respectively. In 2020, Otsuka had the name in the senior national team for the first time and he was one of the outside hitters in 2020 Summer Olympics.

Clubs 
  Panasonic Panthers Junior
  Rakunan High School (2016–2018)
  Waseda University (2019–2022)
  Panasonic Panthers (2021–Present)

Individual Award
 2021-2022 V.League Division 1 -  Best Rookie Award

See also 
 List of Waseda University people
 Player Profile at FIVB

References

 2000 births
 Living people
 Japanese men's volleyball players
 Sportspeople from Osaka Prefecture
 Waseda University alumni
Volleyball players at the 2020 Summer Olympics
Olympic volleyball players of Japan
Outside hitters
21st-century Japanese people